Frøken Møllers jubilæum is a 1937 Danish comedy film  directed and written by Lau Lauritzen Jr. and Alice O'Fredericks. The film stars Liva Weel and Victor Borge.

Cast
Liva Weel as Frk. Møller 
Victor Borge as Klaverstemmer Asmussen ... credited as Børge Rosenbaum
Karen Jønsson as Grete Holm 
Lau Lauritzen Jr. as Ingeniør Peter Juhl 
Poul Reichhardt as Peters friend
Per Gundmann as Peters friend 
Jon Iversen as Direktør Smith 
Thorkil Lauritzen as Secretary 
Paul Rohde as Fuldmægtig Petersen 
Holger Strøm as Hotelrotte 
Olaf Ussing as Hotelrotte 
Alex Suhr as Konduktør 
Erik Olsson as Hotelkarl

See also
Winter Night's Dream (1935)
Julia jubilerar (1938)

References

External links
Frk. Møllers jubilæum at the Danish Film Database

1930s Danish-language films
1937 films
Danish black-and-white films
Films directed by Lau Lauritzen Jr.
Films directed by Alice O'Fredericks
1937 comedy films
Danish comedy films
Remakes of German films